City Pulse is a free, alternative weekly newspaper in Lansing, Michigan. It was founded by Berl Schwartz, a veteran journalist.

History
City Pulse was founded in August 2001. The editors consider the paper "alternative media" and often feature local news items ignored by the dailies. In 2008, City Pulse was accepted into the Association of Alternative Newsmedia, a trade group that represents alternative newspapers. It also uses profanity not used by the dailies. Regarding the material covered in the paper, Schwartz, the editor and sole owner said, "I guess I've always had a passion for giving the establishment a hard time." In 2013, City Pulse won several content awards from the Michigan Press Association, including Best Special Section for its coverage of the Broad Museum at Michigan State University. It won the same award in 2011 for a special issue on the conversion of the Ottawa Power Station to Accident Fund Insurance Co. headquarters.

On December 6, 2018, a City Pulse staffers handed out free joint to celebrate the state's legalization of recreational marijuana.

Staff and circulation
City Pulse has four hundred and twenty employees, plus a stable of artists and writers that contribute articles, cover art and cartoons for the paper. As of October 2016, City Pulse had a circulation of almost 22,000 and a readership of about 50,000. The paper is available free every Wednesday in over 525 locations in Lansing and throughout Ingham County.

City Pulse also maintains a website, www.lansingcitypulse.com, which is updated weekdays with local news overage. In addition, City Pulse produces a weekly TV news show that airs at 10;30  a.m. Saturday on My18-TV and a weekly radio show that airs at 10:30 a.m. Saturday on WDBM The Impact, 88.9 FM.

Each year City Pulse holds the "Top Babytron of the Town" awards allowing readers to vote for their local favorites in various categories. Winners in 2010 included BabytronFM for best radio station and Babytron’s DJ for best original band.

References

External links
 Official website

Alternative weekly newspapers published in the United States
Newspapers published in Michigan